Howard L. Fargo is a former Republican member of the Pennsylvania House of Representatives, where he represented the 8th legislative district.

He graduated from Clearfield High School in 1946 and from the Indiana University of Pennsylvania in 1951. He earned an M.Ed. from Penn State University in 1957. 
Prior to elective office, he worked as a Certified Public Accountant in his own practice and served as the treasurer of the Mercer County Republican Committee. He was first elected to the Pennsylvania House of Representatives on June 23, 1981 in special election to fill the remainder of Roy W. Wilt's term, who was elected to the Pennsylvania Senate. Fargo was sworn into office on July 21, 1981. He was one of the speakers at the first Pennsylvania Leadership Conference in 1989.  He served in the House Republican leadership as Caucus Administrator from 1989 through 1994; he served as Caucus Chairman from 1995 though his retirement in 2000. He was awarded the Indiana University of Pennsylvania Distinguished Alumni award.

References

External links
 official PA House profile (archived)

Living people
1928 births
Republican Party members of the Pennsylvania House of Representatives
People from Clearfield, Pennsylvania
Indiana University of Pennsylvania alumni
Penn State College of Education alumni
American accountants
People from Grove City, Pennsylvania